Jo Ann Barnett Shipps (born 1929), known as Jan Shipps, is an American historian specializing in Mormon history, particularly in the latter half of the 20th century to the present. Shipps is generally regarded as the foremost non-Mormon scholar of the Latter Day Saint movement, having given particular attention to the Church of Jesus Christ of Latter-day Saints (LDS Church). Her first book on the subject was Mormonism: The Story of a New Religious Tradition published by the University of Illinois Press. In 2000, the University of Illinois Press published her book Sojourner in the Promised Land: Forty Years Among the Mormons, in which she interweaves her own history of Mormon-watching with 16 essays on Mormon history and culture.

Career as a scholar 
Shipps has a Ph.D. in history. She taught at Indiana University–Purdue University Indianapolis for many years and is now professor emeritus of history and religious studies. Her interest in Mormonism was sparked when she lived briefly with her young family in Logan, Utah in 1960–61, graduating from Utah State University in 1961. She earned her PhD degree at University of Colorado Boulder in 1965, with a dissertation on The Mormons in Politics: The First Hundred Years.

A lifelong practicing Methodist, Shipps is widely respected in Mormon historical circles, as well as secular historical circles, for her ability to understand Mormonism on its own terms while maintaining sufficient distance as an outsider. Shipps served as a senior editor of The Journals of William McLellin, 1831–1836, the earliest extended account of the Mormon experience. She was the first non-Mormon and the first woman elected president of the Mormon History Association (MHA). Her articles about the Latter Day Saints have been published in a number of both academic and popular journals, and she speaks frequently about Mormonism to both Mormon and non-Mormon audiences.

Theories and arguments 
Shipps has studied how perceptions of Mormons have changed over time and the process by which Latter Day Saints have gained a sense of distinctive self-identity. She has established academic standards for the use of the terms Latter Day Saint, Latter-day Saint, and Mormon for the various churches and movements that trace their origins back to Joseph Smith. Her scholarship brought attention to the "doughnut syndrome"; cases where histories of the Western United States ignore or give superficial treatment to the history of Utah territory, Mormonism and Mormon colonization. This syndrome, Shipps argues, may be due to the fact that Utah and Mormon history is dramatically different from the settlement of the rest of the West. While Western history usually emphasizes the individualistic, universalistic nature of early Western US society, the settlement of the Utah Territory was characterized by ordered and communal societies.

Recent contributions 
In her 2000 book Sojourner in the Promised Land: Forty Years Among the Mormons, Shipps documents what she calls, "the gathering of the scattered and the scattering of the gathering." Shipps details how the LDS Church changed its central gathering point from Utah to local stakes anywhere in the world as spiritual, cultural and physical gathering points.

Since retiring from being a professor, Shipps continues to write about Latter Day Saint history and consults with journalists about news on the movement. In 2005, she gave a paper on the LDS Church at a global religion at a conference commemorating Smith, founder of the Latter Day Saint movement, held at the Library of Congress. She also keynoted an April 2007 conference in Arkansas honoring early apostle Parley P. Pratt. The conference marked the sesquicentennial of Pratt's 1857 murder and the bicentennial of his birth.

Scholarly associations 
Shipps has long been an avid promoter of scholarly associations. She has served as president of the MHA (1979–80), the John Whitmer Historical Association (2004–05), and the American Society of Church History (2006).

Publications 
As author:
 Mormonism: The Story of a New Religious Tradition. 1987. 
 Sojourner in the Promised Land: Forty Years among the Mormons. 2000.  – collected essays
 
As editor: 
 with Welch, John W. The Journal of William E. McLellin, 1831–1836. 1994.
 with Silk, Mark. Religion and Public Life in the Mountain West: Sacred Landscapes in Transition (Religion by Region Series, #2). 2004. 

Collections:
 Howard R. Lamar, Richard L. Bushman, Donald Worster, Jan Shipps. Collected Leonard J. Arrington Mormon History Lectures. Merrill Library, 2004.
 Gerald D. Nash, Eugene England, Dean L. May, Jan Shipps, James B. Allen. Twentieth Century American West: Contributions to an Understanding. 1994.

Notes

References

External links

1929 births
21st-century American historians
21st-century American male writers
21st-century American women
American Methodists
American women historians
Historians of the Latter Day Saint movement
Indiana University faculty
Living people
Methodist scholars
Mormon studies scholars
Presidents of the American Society of Church History
University of Colorado Boulder alumni
Utah State University alumni
American male non-fiction writers